The Estadio Alejandro Morera Soto is a football stadium in El Llano neighborhood of Alajuela, Costa Rica, which is the home of Liga Deportiva Alajuelense, one of the most successful football clubs from Costa Rica. It also serves as the home ground of Carmelita, who rent the stadium from Alajuelense.

The stadium, which holds a capacity of 17,895 people, is named after Alejandro Morera Soto, a notable former player of LD Alajuelense, FC Barcelona, and Hércules CF.

History

Construction
The project to find a proper site for a permanent home started in 1938 when the director of the club, Carlos Bolaños, proposed that the club should purchase its own land. The land was purchased in 1940, but the site would not be soccer-ready until 1942, when Alajuelense played its first match at the site. The first game was played on January 18, 1942 when Liga Deportiva Alajuelense played Club Sport Cartagines. The Estadio Alejandro Morera Soto is known as the Cathedral of Costa Rican Soccer.

On September 27, 1949, a professor from a local high school named Armando Morux Sancho started what was called "La marcha del ladrillo" (The Brick's March) in which every student would donate a brick to help building the concrete walls of the stadium and start building the concrete stands. The first stands that were built were the ones located in north, west an east around the pitch.

On July 20, 1966, due to a motion by the Municipality of Alajuela, the stadium was renamed to honor the great Alajuelense and Barcelona player Alejandro Morera Soto. On March 19, 1970, the stadium saw its first night game when Alajuelense faced Honduran club team Motagua, beating them 4–1.

In 1979, the enlargement of the stadium was initiated with the project of building a second stand on top of the first already built and add an additional stand over the dressing and conference room (south) and also, add roof to the stand located on east and the one located on south after was finished. The project was fully completed in 1984. The stadium was re-inaugurated that year along with the new illumination, which was at the moment, in the top illuminations systems.

Development
Costa Rican football started getting more attention by the international press after the national team participated to the World Cup in 1990 and with footballers playing abroad. The club decided to build a royal box in the top of the west stand, which would have a two-floor royal box with TVs, carpet, bathrooms, elevator, and air conditioner. The royal box was finished in 1999 and is the only team in Costa Rica with such an amenity.

In 1997, the Municipality of Alajuela agreed to change the name from Estadio Municipal de Alajuela to Estadio Alejandro Morera Soto.

In 2002, the illumination system was upgraded, being the stadium with the best illumination in the country.

Until 2005, the Morera Soto's grass was known as the best natural one in Central America, but a combination of fungus and hurricanes affected the grass and it never fully recovered. By the end of 2008, the management of the team decided to install a fifth-generation synthetic grass, in order to have the field always ready for games no matter the weather, also have the availability to rent the venue for music concerts and/or special events and have the possibility for the younger divisions to train in the same field. The last game the team played on the natural turf was the first game of the 2008 winter's final, beating their archrival Deportivo Saprissa 2–0 on December 17, 2008.

In 2009, the club installed a synthetic turf called Xtreme Turf from ACT Global Sports.  This football turf has achieved FIFA two-star certification for approval for top international matches.  This is the only FIFA two-star installation currently in Central America. After a long delay, the field was ready to be used by July 18, 2009. The field's re-opening game was held against Caracas FC from Venezuela; the game ended up with a tie 1–1.

On July 3, 2011, the stadium name was changed from "Estadio Alejandro Morera Soto" to "Estadio Alejandro Morera Soto Scotiabank", due to sponsorship from Scotiabank.

International events

2010 CONCACAF Women's U-17 Championship
The Estadio Alejandro Morera Soto hosted the 2010 CONCACAF Women's U-17 Championship. It hosted six Group A matches, including the opener; six Group B games; two semifinal matches; the third-place play-off; and the final. The games were:

2014 FIFA U-17 Women's World Cup
La Catedral del Fútbol hosted six games of the 2014 FIFA U-17 Women's World Cup. It hosted four Group D matches; a Group A and Group B game. The games were:

2022 FIFA U-20 Women's World Cup
Estadio Alejandro Morera Soto hosted 14 games of the 2022 FIFA U-20 Women's World Cup. It hosted two Group A matches; four Group B games, including the opener; two Group C games, four Group D games; and two quarterfinal matches. The games were:

Other events
One of the main concerts the stadium held was Elton John during his tour "Made in England" in November 1995. The British heavy metal band Iron Maiden played in this stadium in 2009. Korn and P.O.D. offered a joint concert at the stadium in 2010.

The stadium hosted two WWE house shows: the first was SmackDown on February 13, 2010, and the second was RAW on February 25, 2011.

References

External links
Stadium pictures

Football venues in Costa Rica
Multi-purpose stadiums in Costa Rica
Buildings and structures in Alajuela Province
Liga Deportiva Alajuelense